Priya or Pria ( Priyā, female, meaning "dear, beloved") is a common given name in India which is also used in Nepal, Bangladesh, Sri Lanka and Thailand.

People 
 Priya A. S., Indian author
 Priya Anand (born 1986), Indian actress and model
 Priya Badlani (born 1986), Indian actress and model
 Priya Bapat (born 1986), Indian actress
 Priya Basil (born 1977), British writer
 Priya Bathija (born 1985), Indian actress
 Priya Cooper (born 1974), Australian swimmer
 Priya David (born 1974), American journalist
 Priya Dutt (born 1966), Indian politician
 Priya Gill (born 1977), Indian actress
 Priya Himesh (born 1982), Indian singer
 Priya Kaur-Jones (born 1979), British newsreader and presenter
 Priya Krishna, Indian-American author and chef
 Priya Lal (born 1993), British-Indian actress, dancer and singer
 Priya Paul (born 1967), Indian businesswoman and entrepreneur
 Priya P.V, Indian footballer and manager
 Priya Rajvansh (1937–2000), Indian actress
 Priya Ramrakha (1935–1968), Kenyan photojournalist
 Priya Raman (born 1974), Indian actress and producer
 Priya Ranjan Dasmunsi (born 1945), Indian politician and member of the 14th Lok Sabha of India
 Priya Sharma (author) (born 1971), British fantasy and horror short-story writer and novelist
 Priya Suriyasena (born 1952), Sri Lankan singer
 Priya Tendulkar (1954–2002), Indian actress, social activist and writer
 Priya Wal (born 1985), Indian actress

Fictional characters 
 Priya Kapoor, from the Australian television soap opera Neighbours
 Priya Koothrappali, from The Big Bang Theory television series
 Priya Mangal, character from the 2022 Pixar film Turning Red
 Priya Sharma, from the British soap opera Emmerdale
 Priya Tsetsang, the original identity of Sierra in the US television series Dollhouse

See also
 Preeya Kalidas (born 1980), British-Indian actress and singer
 Prija

References

Hindu given names
Indian feminine given names
Nepalese given names